Fiesta was a British glamour photography magazine published from 1956 to 1959. It was the sister magazine to Carnival. It was published by Gannet Press (Sales) Ltd of Birkenhead, England. 

While mostly black-and-white, the covers and some inside photography were printed in colour. The magazine featured work by the photographers Harrison Marks and Russell Gay.

References

Magazines established in 1956
Magazines disestablished in 1959
Photography magazines
Defunct magazines published in the United Kingdom
Visual arts magazines published in the United Kingdom